The following lists events that happened during 2012 in Laos.

Incumbents
Party General Secretary: Choummaly Sayasone
President: Choummaly Sayasone
Vice President:  Bounnhang Vorachith
Prime Minister: Thongsing Thammavong

Events

September
 September 6 - After Sri Lanka, Chinese Minister of Defence Liang Guanglie leaves India for Laos.

November
 November 5 - Asian and European leaders meet at the Ninth Asia–Europe Meeting in Vientiane to discuss issues including the current financial crisis. 51 foreign leaders are expected to attend including premier of China Wen Jiabao and President of Laos Choummaly Sayasone.

References

 
2010s in Laos
Years of the 21st century in Laos
Laos
Laos